Yusuf Salahuddin (born 29 June 1982) is an Indian politician from the state of Bihar. As a Member of the Rashtriya Janata Dal, he represents the Simri Bakhtiarpur assembly seat in Bihar since 2020.

Yusuf is the son of Lok Janshakti Party parliamentarian Mehboob Ali Kaiser and grandson of the late Choudhary Salahuddin (former Cabinet minister of Bihar). He belongs to a Nawab family and decedents of Nawab Nazirul Hasan of Simri Bakhtiyarpur (erstwhile princely state).

References 

1982 births
Rashtriya Janata Dal politicians
People from Patna
Bihar MLAs 2020–2025
Living people